William Crawford Honeyman (1845–1919) was a Scottish musician and author.

Biography

William C. Honeyman was born in Wellington, New Zealand in 1845 to Thomas and Eliza Honeyman, who had emigrated from Scotland four years earlier. He was the grandson of minor Scottish poet and songwriter, Adam Crawford. Honeyman returned to Britain with his mother and three siblings in 1849. He was a violinist and orchestra leader who, under his real name, published violin instructional books such as How to Play the Violin and The Secrets of Violin Playing.  His daughter Liza was an accomplished violinist who played a Guarnerius made in Cremona in 1742.  Sivori (Paganini's only pupil) proclaimed it to be "the finest toned violin in the world."

He was much better known, however, in his own time under his pseudonym, James McGovan (or James M'Govan), a writer of police detective novels.

Readers did not initially realise the works were fiction, but assumed they were true stories in the vein of James McLevy. McGovan's stories were so highly regarded in his own time, that an 1888 Publishers' Circular "proclaimed McGovan’s articles 'the best detective stories (true stories, we esteem them) that we ever met with.'"

Historians believe Edinburgh resident Arthur Conan Doyle was aware of and influenced by McGowan's tales and went on to publish his first Sherlock Holmes story in 1887.

Miscellaneous works

Non-fiction

Fiction

References

1845 births
1919 deaths
Scottish crime fiction writers
Scottish mystery writers
Scottish novelists
Scottish short story writers
Scottish non-fiction writers
Scottish historical novelists
Scottish conductors (music)
Scottish classical violinists
Anglo-Scots